Archey is a surname. Notable people with the surname include:

Gilbert Archey (1890–1974), New Zealand zoologist, ethnologist, and museum director
Jimmy Archey (1902–1967), American jazz trombonist
Karen Archey, American art critic and curator
Lamon Archey (born 1981), American model and actor